SS Ralph Creyke was a passenger and freight vessel built for the Goole Steam Shipping Company in 1878.

History 

The ship was built by Hardcastle and Watson, Pallion, Sunderland for the Goole Steam Shipping Company, named after the former local MP Ralph Creyke, and launched on 21 March 1878 by Miss Creyke. The engines were fitted by Patterson and Atkinson, St. Lawrence Engine Works, Newcastle.

On 20 February 1879, Ralph Creyke foundered in a storm in the Celtic Sea 16 miles southwest of Lundy Island during a voyage from Cardiff, Wales, to Dieppe, France. Her name was used for a replacement vessel, which was delivered later that year.

References 

1878 ships
Maritime incidents in February 1879
Shipwrecks in the Celtic Sea
Steamships of the United Kingdom
Ships built on the River Wear